Railway platform height is the built height – above top of rail (ATR) – of passenger platforms at stations. A connected term is train floor height, which refers to the ATR height of the floor of rail vehicles. Worldwide, there are many, frequently incompatible, standards for platform heights and train floor heights. Where raised platforms are in use, train widths must also be compatible, in order to avoid both large gaps between platform and trains and mechanical interference liable to cause equipment damage.

Differences in platform height (and platform gap) can pose a risk for passenger safety. Differences between platform height and train floor height may also make boarding much more difficult, or impossible, for wheelchair-using passengers and people with other mobility impairments, increasing station dwell time as platform or staff are required to deploy ramps to assist boarding. Platform ramps, steps, and platform gap fillers together with hazard warnings such as "mind the gap" are used to reduce risk and facilitate access. Platform height affects the loading gauge (the maximum size of train cars), and must conform to the structure gauge physical clearance specifications for the system. Tracks which are shared between freight and passenger service must have platforms which do not obstruct either type of railroad car.

To reduce construction costs, the platforms at stations on many railway systems are of low height, making it necessary for passenger cars to be equipped with external steps or internal stairs allowing passengers access to and from car floor levels. When railways were first introduced in the 19th century, low platforms were widely used from the 1880s, especially in rural areas, except in the United Kingdom. Over the years, raised platforms have become far more widespread, and are almost universal for high-speed express routes and universal in cities on commuter and rapid transit lines. Raised platforms on narrow gauge railways can prevent track gauge conversion to standard gauge or broad gauge.

Height categories

Buses, trams, trolleys, and railway passenger cars are divided into several typical categories.

 Ultra Low Floor tram – 
 Low floor tram – 
 High floor tram – more than 
 Low floor train – 
 Train (in UK or narrow gauge) – 
 Standard North American passenger cars – 
 Train (standard gauge (except UK) or broad gauge) – 
These are floor heights. The platforms can be much lower, overcome by onboard staircases.

Africa

Algeria

Kenya
The  meter gauge platforms are 1100mm.

Asia

China

China Railway platforms are classified into the following categories of "low" , "medium" , "high"  and "ultra high"  (latter 2 for most new and rebuilt platforms). Areas adjacent to broad gauge countries/regions, such as Xinjiang and Inner-Mongolia, are still equipped with low platforms. Under the concession period since late 2016, platforms on the southeastern corridor from Shenzhen to Ruili to be  ATR, whereas the northern-, central-, and western-Chinese platforms to be  ATR, are recommended.

Hong Kong
Hong Kong's railway network consists of the local MTR network (including the former KCR), Hong Kong Tramways, and the Hong Kong section of the XRL high-speed line.

MTR network

The urban lines include the Tsuen Wan line, Kwun Tong line, Tseung Kwan O line, Island line, and South Island line.

Former KCR network

High-speed rail line

India

Indonesia
Most railway stations in Indonesia use low platforms.

Iran
Like in China, areas adjacent to broad gauge countries/regions such as the eastern regions such as around Mashhad and Zahedan, still equipped low platforms.

Israel

Japan
The Japanese National Railways (JNR) for many years used a triple-standard for its conventional (Cape gauge) lines:
  for long-distance trains (originally step-fitted passenger cars pulled by steam engines);
  for commuter trains (step-less electric multiple units at a time when long-distance trains were not); and
  shared platforms that could serve both with relatively little discomfort (roughly level with the step on passenger carriages but not too low to board commuter trains).

However, increasing electrification and the phasing-out of locomotive traction in favor of multiple units has made the distinction a matter of historical, rather than practical relevance. Recently, at Japan Railways Group stations in urban centers such as Tokyo and Osaka, whose lines were the earliest to be electrified,  is the norm and lower-level platforms are generally raised to this height during station improvements or refurbishment. Elsewhere, such as Hokkaido and the Tohoku/Hokuriku region of Honshu,  – and even  platforms are still commonplace. As this represents a potential obstacle when boarding modern commuter trains, workarounds such as a step built into the floor of area-specific trainsets are often employed. Nevertheless, with accessibility becoming a greater concern as Japan's population ages, raising the level of the platform itself (in tandem with other improvements such as elevators and escalators) is seen as the most practical solution.

In at least one case, with the E721 series EMU used on JR East lines in the Tohoku region, the floor of the train itself is lowered to be nearly level to existing  platforms. This makes level boarding feasible at many stations (and boarding less of a hassle at stations with the lowest  platforms). However, this (along with a different standard of electrification) also makes through service southward to Tokyo impossible, and prevents them from running on certain through lines, such as the Senseki-Tohoku Line, since the Senseki Line portion uses the higher  platforms (and DC electrification).

In contrast to the above standards, the standard gauge Shinkansen (Bullet Train) has, since its original inception, used only  platforms. However, exceptions from this include the "Mini-Shinkansen" Yamagata Shinkansen and Akita Shinkansen lines, which use  platforms to maintain compatibility with conventional JR trainsets.

Most standard gauge non-JR commuter railways, such as Kintetsu Nara Line and Keisei Line, use  platforms.

North Korea
North Korea's platforms are standardized at  only. In there,  is the norm, lower-level platforms are already raised to this height.

South Korea
Typically, older platforms are lower than 500 mm. For metro trains, higher platforms which height after  are used. Nuriro trains are using mechanical steps to allow both type of platforms. Korail has a long-term plan to change platform standards to higher platforms; both KTX-Eum and EMU-320 are designed to use higher platforms.

Philippines

There are various platform heights for railway lines in the Philippines.

Previously, the Philippine National Railways had lower platforms prior to the 2009 reconstruction of its network.

Taiwan 

Thailand 
Old railway platforms are usually less than 500 mm (20 in) in height. New platforms along double tracking projects, red line projects, and metro stations are built at  height. Bang Bamru railway station is built with both high and low platforms.

Pakistan

Turkmenistan

Uzbekistan

Eurasia

Kazakhstan
In Kazakhstan, only Astana Nurly Jol station and Russian Railway's Petropavlovsk station have  platforms.

Russia
As of late 2015, there are three standard heights of platforms, which include:
 for long-distance trains (originally locomotive-hauled step-fitted passenger carriages);
 for direct-current only commuter trains (step-less direct current commuter electric multiple units at a time when long-distance trains were not); and
 for shared platforms that could serve both with relatively little discomfort (roughly level with the steps on passenger carriages but not too low to board commuter trains).

In some urban areas, such as Moscow and St Petersburg, served only by local traffic, use  platforms for direct-current electric multiple units. Elsewhere,  and even  platforms are almost commonplace. In some cases, such as VR Sm4 of Finland, the floor of the train itself lowered to be nearly level to  platforms. This makes level boarding feasible at some stations (and boarding less of a hassle at stations with the lowest  platforms).

Turkey
But most of the platforms throughout the network are old and thus out of standard.

Europe

European Union

The European Union Commission issued a TSI (Technical Specifications for Interoperability) on 30 May 2002 (2002/735/EC) that sets out standard platform heights for passenger steps on high-speed rail.

Broad-gauge railways
The proposed  (Russian gauge) railways (e.g.

Channel Tunnel

Rail Baltica

Belgium
Belgium has been using mixed type of platform heights (due to the age of the network, and the different companies running it before 1923).

There is a plan to comply with the European TSI by raising all low platform heights to one of the European Standard Heights. Some stations, or stopping points, already having  platform heights will keep the platforms at these heights.

Finland

The sole exception on the national railway network is the Nikkilä halt which has a platform height of 400 mm (15.8 in).

There are current proposed figures:

Germany

This does not include light rail systems that follow the BOStrab standard, with newer metro lines to use low-floor trams which have a usual floor height of  so that platforms are constructed as low as 300 mm in accordance with BOStrab that requires the platform height not to be higher than the floor height.

The traditional platforms had a very diverse height as the nationwide railway network is a union of earlier railway operators. The TSI standard of  height, historically common in the East, is widely used on regional lines.

Ireland
While older platforms on the Dublin and Kingstown Railway were at lower levels, all platforms are now 915mm above rail and all new platforms are being built at that level. Amongst other work, there is an ongoing program of platform renewal. Both of Ireland's railway companies (Irish Rail in the Republic of Ireland and Northern Ireland Railways in Northern Ireland) have had some derogations from EU standards as their mainline rail systems, while connected to each other, are not connected to any other system.

Tram floors are at the same height, but have internal steps over the bogies.

Luxembourg
The  platforms for the Namur-Luxembourg line (with 3kV DC electrification).

Netherlands
Dutch infrastructure maintainer ProRail has committed to upgrading all stations to  platform height.

Poland
In some rural or urban/suburban areas (e.g. around Warsaw) platforms used by local traffic are lower or higher, respectively.

Spain

Sweden
Sweden has generally  platforms for mainline trains. Stockholm Commuter Rail has almost always its own platforms at  height which allows stepless trains of type X60. The Arlanda Express service has  platform height with floor at platform level. They have their own platforms and trains, which are incompatible with mainline platforms and trains, even if the Arlanda Express goes on a mainline. The stations Sundbyberg and Knivsta have one platform each used by both commuter trains and regional mainline trains, which can cause uncomfortable steps, but is accepted. Sundbyberg has 730 mm and Knivsta has around 500 mm. Stockholm Central station has after the commuter trains moved to the "City" station, two high 730 mm platforms, now used for mainline trains. The Stockholm Metro and Saltsjöbanan have , while tramways in general have a very low platform, often also used by buses which must allow boarding from places without platform.

United Kingdom

This is to provide true step free access to trains at the new HS2 stations, which is not possible using European Standards or UK standard heights. HS2 trains will operate outside of the HS2 line using existing infrastructure, which will not be step free.

France
However, this rule is not respected for parts of the RER and Transilien network.

North America

Canada

Intercity and commuter rail

West Coast Express has accessible boarding platforms at all stations. However, unlike the SkyTrain, there is a small height difference and door-level for wheelchair access are provided at all stations.

Metro and light rail
All rapid transit and light rail systems, except for the Toronto streetcar system, provide level boarding between trains and platforms. The platform heights vary per line, as per the table below.

On the Toronto streetcar system, most stops are in mixed traffic accessed from the road surface, without raised platforms. Where raised platforms do exist, they are at sidewalk curb height and not at the height of the vehicle floor. As a result, people using wheeled mobility aids need to use the wheelchair ramp even at stops where a raised platform exists.

United States

New and substantially renovated stations in the United States must comply with the Americans with Disabilities Act, which requires level boarding. Metro and light rail systems feature a variety of different platform heights.

Intercity and commuter rail with high platforms
This height was introduced in the 1960s on the Long Island Rail Road with the M1 railcars. MBTA Commuter Rail, CTrail's Hartford Line and Shore Line East, Long Island Rail Road, Metro-North Railroad, NJ Transit, and SEPTA Regional Rail all use this height for new and renovated stations, though low platforms remain at some older stations.

Outside the Northeast U.S., Metra Electric District, South Shore Line, RTD, WES Commuter Rail, and SMART use 48-inch platforms.

Amtrak intercity services feature high-level platforms on the Northeast Corridor, Keystone Corridor, Empire Corridor, and New Haven–Springfield Line, although some stations on these lines have not been retrofitted with high platforms. High-level platforms are also present at a small number of stations on other lines, including Worcester, Roanoke, Raleigh, and several Downeaster stations. Brightline service in Florida also uses high level platforms.

At some stations, a desired high-level platform is impractical due to wide freight trains or other practicalities. (Gauntlet tracks, which permit wide freights to pass full-length high-level platforms, have practical issues of their own.) At these locations, mini-high platforms are often used for accessibility. Mini-high platforms have a short length of high platform, long enough for one or two doors, with an accessible ramp to the longer low platform. The platform edge is usually hinged so that it can be flipped out of the way of passing freights.

Intercity and commuter rail with low platforms
Most other commuter rail systems in the U.S. and Amtrak stations have  low-level platforms to accommodate freight trains, with mini-high platforms or portable lifts to reach the -high floors of low-level bilevel railcars. Single-deck cars, which generally serve the prevalent high platforms in the Northeast, feature trapdoors that expose stairs so that passengers can access the low platforms.

(Mixed consists of double decks and single decks can sometimes be seen in the FrontRunner system in Utah.) The Bombardier BiLevel Coach is used on many commuter rail networks in North America, with Coaster having  platforms to match their floor height. Once electrified, the new Caltrain trains will be equipped for both  platform heights in anticipation of sharing facilities with California High-Speed Rail trains. A small number of systems do use low-floor single deck trains, including TEXRail and others that use Stadler FLIRT and GTW rolling stock.

All of Amtrak's bilevel cars, which are all Superliners, are entirely low-floor and have step-free passthroughs on the upper deck, with the exception of "transition" sleeper cars where one end features stairs to maintain compatibility with single-deck cars (including Amtrak's own baggage cars).

Metro and light rail
Platform heights of metro systems vary by system and even by line.

Most light rail systems have platforms around  ATR, allowing level boarding on low-floor light rail vehicles. Most new systems are built to this standard, and some older systems like VTA light rail have been converted. Several systems including MetroLink use higher platforms with level boarding. Several older light rail systems have high-floor vehicles but low platforms, with mini-high platforms or lifts for accessibility. Some, like the MBTA Green Line, are being converted to low-floor rolling stock, while others, like Baltimore Light Rail have permanent mini-high platforms.

Oceania

Australia
The majority of railway systems in Australia use high level platforms with a platform height a small distance below the train floor level. Exception to this include Queensland who have narrow gauge trains and lower platforms, and South Australia who have trains fitted with low level steps to enable the use of low level platforms.

This has become the standard for all subsequent platforms and trains in NSW.

In Victoria, the standard platform height for metropolitan and regional stations is 1080mm above the top of rail.

Metro and light rail
The tramway network in Melbourne have some low level platforms and low floor vehicles, but most trams have steps and are boarded from the road. The Adelaide Tram line has low platforms at almost all stops and operates almost entirely with low-floor trams which also have retractable ramps for street boarding where required by persons unable to step up. The Gold Coast and Sydney light rail networks have low floor trams and platforms at all stops.

South America

Argentina

See also 

 Berne gauge
 Gauntlet track
 High-floor
 Loading gauge
 Platform gap
 Street running
 Tram stop

Notes

References

Sources

External links

Rail loading gauge
Rail transport articles in need of updating
Railway platforms